Airlink is an airline based in Johannesburg, South Africa. Its main business is to provide services between smaller, under-served towns and larger hub airports. It has since expanded to offer flights on larger, mainline routes. The airline has an ever-expanding network of over 60 routes across 50+ destinations. In January 2021, it became the second-largest carrier within Africa by number of flights, and third-largest by number of seats.

History

Early years
Airlink was formed in 1992 by business partners Rodger Foster and Barrie Webb, following the purchase of the liquidated Link Airways business, which had incorporated a range of other airlines: Midlands Aviation (founded in 1967), Lowveld Aviation Services, Magnum Airways, Border Air and Citi Air. The new airline was named Airlink.

In 1995, SA Airlink officially launched on 25 March at a gathering of important guests, including Queen Elizabeth II. Later that year, the airline aligned its branding with that of South African Airways and joined their Voyager frequent-flyer programme. In 1997, SA Airlink further strengthened their partnership with South African Airways, and joined both SAA and South African Express in a strategic alliance. This alliance and partnership created the biggest airline network in Africa. The alliance was governed by a franchise agreement, which saw SA Airlink adopt the "South African" brand identity and become South African Airlink. In 1999, South African Airlink entered into a joint venture with the government of Swaziland (now Eswatini) to create a new airline to replace the defunct Royal Swazi National Airways. In August 2000, the strategic alliance with South African Airways was further strengthened as a bilateral partnership.

Development in the 2000s

In 2006, South African Airlink exited the strategic alliance with South African Airways and entered into a franchise agreement, dropping the "South African" branding from their name, but retaining a similar colour scheme. SA Airlink introduced their unique Sunbird logo as part of the new branding. In February 2008, SA Airlink successfully completed the IATA Operational Safety Audit (IOSA), and was placed on the IATA registry with code "4Z". On 23 December 2009, the SA Civil Aviation Authority grounded their fleet of 13 BAe Jetstream 41 planes. Following audits of the airline's procedures and inspection of the grounded aircraft, they were returned to service. A problem with a seal in the aircraft's Honeywell engines was found to be the cause of safety issues.

In 2016, SA Airlink signed an agreement with the government of Madagascar to operate scheduled domestic air services within it, and regional air services to and from the island. The airline also established a training centre in partnership with Embraer at their headquarters in Bonaero Park, Johannesburg. On 3 May 2017, Airlink became the first airline in history to make a commercial charter flight to Saint Helena in the South Atlantic Ocean, landing a BAe Avro RJ-85 at the newly constructed Saint Helena Airport to pick up passengers stranded there when the island's only link with the outside world, the British Royal Mail Ship RMS St Helena, suffered propeller damage.

No other commercial airliner landed at St Helena until 14 October 2017, when Airlink began history's first scheduled commercial airline service to Saint Helena Airport, with an Embraer E190 with 78 passengers aboard arriving after a flight of about six hours from Johannesburg, with a stop at Walvis Bay, Namibia. The flight began a once-a-week scheduled service between Johannesburg and Saint Helena.

In 2018, SA Airlink and FlySafair concluded negotiations for a merger. The application was turned down by the South African Competition Commission on the basis that it believed that regional airline SA Airlink and low-cost carrier FlySafair were competitors. The matter was referred to the Tribunal, but the application was withdrawn as the shareholders' objectives of both companies had changed. In 2019, SA Airlink expanded its training centre in cooperation with Embraer to house both an Embraer E190 and an Embraer ERJ-145 full flight simulator.

In 2020, SA Airlink changed its name from SA Airlink to Airlink. The change was made to distinguish the company as an independent airline. Airlink ended its 23-year old franchise agreement with South African Airways in the early part of 2020. It has been operating and issuing tickets under its own 4Z ticket stock instead of South African Airways' SA code since then, and signed its own interline agreements with six other carriers. On 12 November 2020, Airlink unveiled a new livery, dropping any similarities to the South African Airways brand and incorporating the Sunbird logo set against sunrise colours as the main focal point of the new tail insignia. The first aircraft to sport the design were scheduled to fly during the December holiday season in 2020. In January 2021, Airlink became the third largest carrier within Africa by number of seats offered, and second largest by number of flights scheduled. This is mainly due to Airlink's use of lower capacity aircraft and the opening up of new markets due to the decline of South African Airways.

In March 2022, Airlink committed to a commercial partnership with Federal Airlines, to operate it's Lodgelink flights in the lowveld. The flights connect from either Kruger International or Skukuza to lodges within the lowfeld and Northern KwaZulu Natal. In September 2022, Airlink acquired a 40% stake, labeled a strategic equity holding, in Namibian airline FlyNamibia for an undisclosed sum. The acquisition will have FlyNamibia adopt Airlink's "4Z" flight designation. Airlink will also provide technical and commercial training to FlyNamibia staff.

Corporate affairs

Ownership
Airlink is privately owned, but has published the names of its shareholders:

Sishen Iron Ore Company Community Development Trust (32.51%)
Coronation Capital
SA Airlink Investments (Rodger Foster)
Barrie Webb
South African Airways (2.96%)

Sishen Iron Ore Company Community Development Trust, via its subsidiary Sishen Iron Ore Company Community Development Trust Investment Holdings, acquired a 32.51% stake in the company in June 2012. The original founders, Airlink, Rodger Foster and Barrie Webb, remain shareholders.

Head office
Airlink's head office is in the 3rd office block of the Greenstone Office Park in the Greenstone Hill suburb of Ekurhuleni in Gauteng, South Africa.

Programs

Skybucks
Airlink announced that its highly anticipated loyalty programme will launched on 1 March 2023. This comes after numerous customer suggestions to be rewarded for their loyalty to Airlink, which left the Southern-African airline overwhelmed.

The frequent flyer program will include 3 membership tiers, with eligibility determined by the number of sectors or legs of a journey flown in 12 months. A regular return flight from Johannesburg's OR Tambo to Durban's King Shaka which comprises two sectors.

The Blue Tier is for customers who have flown less than 18 sectors, while the Red Tier is for those with 18 to 34 sectors. The Emerald Tier is for those with more than 35 sectors, and the final Black Tier is by invitation only. Each tier will earn rewards at a different rate, as the higher levels will earn more Skybucks for the same flight and fare. Emerald Tier holders can access SLOW lounges at any major international airports.

SLOW Lounge
Since August 2022 Airlink’s premium and qualifying passengers travelling on its domestic and regional flights, have access to SLOW lounges at Johannesburg’s, Cape Town’s and Durban’s international airports.

Destinations
, Airlink serves 63 routes across the following destinations:

Interline agreements, Codeshares and Partnerships 
Since ending its partnership with SAA in 2020, Airlink interlines with the following airlines:

 Air Belgium
 Air France
 Air Mauritius
 British Airways
 Cathay Pacific
 Condor
 Delta
 El Al
 Emirates (Codeshare) 
 Ethiopian Airlines
 Federal Air (Commercial Partnership)
 FlyNamibia (Franchise Agreement)
 Kenya Airways
 KLM
 LAM Mozambique Airlines
 Lufthansa
 Precision Air
 Qantas
 Qatar Airways (Codeshare) 
 RwandAir
 Singapore Airlines
 Swiss International Air Lines
 TAAG Angola Airlines
 Turkish Airlines
 United Airlines (Codeshare)
 Virgin Atlantic

Fleet

Current fleet
As of December 2022, the Airlink fleet consists of the following aircraft:

Historical fleet
Airlink has previously operated the following aircraft:

Incidents and accidents
 On 24 September 2009, Airlink Flight 8911, a BAe Jetstream 41 ZS-NRM on a positioning flight from Durban International Airport to Pietermaritzburg Airport crashed into the grounds of Merebank Secondary School, Durban shortly after takeoff. The crew declared an emergency, reporting loss of engine power and smoke coming from the rear of the aircraft. The pilots ditched the aircraft on the sports field of the school, avoiding hitting nearby residential areas. The school was closed due to it being a public holiday. All three crew members and one person on the ground were injured. The captain, Allister Freeman, later died as a result of complications from his injuries on 7 October 2009. 
 On 7 December 2009, Airlink Flight 8625, an Embraer ERJ-135 ZS-SJW overran the runway on landing in wet weather at George Airport. No fatalities were reported. The flight was cleared for an Instrument landing (ILS) approach and prevailing weather conditions at the time were overcast with light rain. The landing appeared normal, however the aircraft did not vacate the runway but instead veered to the right and collided with approach lights before it burst through the airport's perimeter fence, coming to rest in a nose-down attitude on a public road. The aircraft was damaged beyond repair. The crew were unable to stop the aircraft due to ineffective braking of the aircraft on the wet runway surface. Two months before the accident the runway was treated with a fog sealant. The day of the accident was the first rain experienced since the runway treatment. The new surface caused a degradation of the surface friction and promoted the formation of pooling. After touch down, the aircraft immediately started aquaplaning and the crew veered to the right to prevent a collision with the localiser antenna. The runway was found non-compliant with ICAO annexe 14 and was subsequently resurfaced. Airlink's insurers took legal action against the state-owned Airports Company of South Africa.
 On 3 January 2022, an Airlink Jetstream 41 ZS-NRJ operating a charter flight to Venetia Mine impacted a kori bustard upon landing. The impact sheared off a propeller on the right-hand engine, causing the engine to overheat, and the crew responded by shutting the engine down. Fragments from the severed propeller impacted the fuselage, ripping a hole in the passenger cabin. None of the passengers or crew were injured, but the aircraft was grounded at Venetia Mine Airport for investigation by the SACAA.

References

External links 

Official website

Airlines of South Africa
Airlines established in 1992
Companies based in Johannesburg
South African brands
South African companies established in 1992